In a Priest Driven Ambulance (With Silver Sunshine Stares) is the fourth album by The Flaming Lips, released in 1990. It is a concept album primarily focused on frontman Wayne Coyne's fascination with religion. It is generally considered among critics to be one of the Flaming Lips' greatest albums. It is the first Flaming Lips album to feature Jonathan Donahue (also of Mercury Rev) and drummer, Nathan Roberts. This line-up would subsequently be signed by Warner Bros. Records and go on to record the follow-up album, Hit to Death in the Future Head

A music video for the song "Unconsciously Screamin" was shot at a religious theme park called Holy Land USA in Waterbury, Connecticut, as well as Hampshire College in Amherst, Massachusetts and City Gardens in Trenton, New Jersey. It was directed by Jim Spring and Jens Jurgensen.

The album was re-released as a CD with two bonus tracks on January 17, 1995, however the full name with subtitle appears only on the vinyl release. It was also re-released in a 2xCD special edition in 2002; for more information on this version, see the entry for The Day They Shot a Hole in the Jesus Egg. The first disc of this release, composed of the entire Priest album and numerous bonus tracks, was also released as a limited-edition two-record vinyl release on pink vinyl.

"Unconsciously Screamin'" was released as an EP in 1991 to promote the album. Two of the B-sides were featured as bonus tracks on the 1995 re-release.

Track listing

Original release

Limited edition vinyl-only reissue
In a Priest Driven Ambulance was reissued in 2005 on pink vinyl.  The reissue is on 4 sides and contains the bonus tracks “Lucifer Rising”, “Ma, I Didn’t Notice”, “Let Me Be It”, “Drug Machine”, and “Strychnine/Peace, Love, and Understanding”. The cover has promotional photos and the inside sleeve has a story about the early Lips by Scott Booker.

 "Drug Machine" is the Sub Pop single rerecording of "Drug Machine in Heaven", the song in its original form was featured on Telepathic Surgery.

Influences
The song "Take Meta Mars" is closely modeled on the Can song "Mushroom" off the album Tago Mago.

Personnel 
Adapted from AllMusic.
 Wayne Coyne – vocals, guitar
 Michael Ivins – bass
 Jonathan Donahue – guitar
 Nathan Roberts - drums
 Dave Fridmann – recording engineer, producer
 Michele Vlasimsky – executive producer, photography

References

1990 albums
The Flaming Lips albums
Restless Records albums
Albums produced by Dave Fridmann